Wronki  is a village in the administrative district of Gmina Świętajno, within Olecko County, Warmian-Masurian Voivodeship, in north-eastern Poland. It is located in the region of Masuria.

History
Wronki was founded in the 16th century. As of 1600, the population of the village was solely Polish. In 1938, during a massive campaign of renaming of placenames, the government of Nazi Germany renamed it to Fronicken in attempt to erase traces of Polish origin. In 1939, it had a population of 342. Following Germany's defeat in World War II, in 1945, the village became again part of Poland and its historic name was restored.

References

Wronki
16th-century establishments in Poland
Populated places established in the 16th century